Ernocornutia termasiana is a species of moth of the family Tortricidae. It is found in Napo Province, Ecuador.

The wingspan is 19 mm. The ground colour of the forewings is cream mixed, strigulated (finely streaked) and dotted with brown. The hindwings are cream, but whiter in the basal part and tinged with pale ochreous in the apical portion.

References

Moths described in 2008
Euliini
Moths of South America
Taxa named by Józef Razowski